Deron, also spelled DeRon or DeRonn, is a male given name. Notable people with this name include:

 Deron Bilous (born 1975), Canadian politician
 Deron Cherry (born 1959), American football player
 Deron Feldhaus (born 1968), American basketball player
 DeRon Jenkins (born 1973), American football player
 Deron Johnson (1938–1992), American baseball player
 Deron Johnson (musician), American jazz keyboardist
 Deron Mayo (born 1988), American football player
 Deron McBee (born 1961), American actor and sportsman
 Deron Miller (born 1976), American heavy metal musician
 DeRonn Scott (born 1991), American basketball player
 Deron Quint (born 1976), American ice hockey player
 Deron Washington (born 1985), American basketball player
 Deron Williams (born 1984), American basketball player

See also
Derron, given name
Daron, given name and surname